Turkish singer Hande Yener's discography consists of thirteen studio albums, one split album, five compilation albums, two extended plays (EP) and thirteen singles. In the early 1990s, she met Sezen Aksu and started working as her backing vocalist. She made her debut in 2000, with her first studio album Senden İbaret, which was released by DMC. Two years later, her second studio album, Sen Yoluna... Ben Yoluma..., was released by Erol Köse Production. The album sold one million copies in the year it was released and received a platinum certification from MÜ-YAP. In 2004, her third studio album, Aşk Kadın Ruhundan Anlamıyor, sold 412,000 copies, and in 2006 her fourth studio album, Apayrı, sold 165,000 copies, both of which received gold certifications.

In 2007, her first electronic music album, Nasıl Delirdim?, was released. She also wrote many of the songs in the album. With her 2008 album Hipnoz and 2009 album Hayrola?, she continued making electronic music. With her eighth studio album Hande'ye Neler Oluyor?, which was released in April 2010, she returned to making pop music. The song "Bodrum" from this album topped the music charts in Turkey. Yener was the featured artist on the song "Atma" from Sinan Akçıl's first studio album Kalp Sesi, which was released in April 2011. In September 2011, she released her ninth studio album Teşekkürler; followed by a split album with pop rock group Seksendört, titled Rüya, which was released in June 2012. In December 2012, her tenth studio album Kraliçe was released. Its lead single, "Hasta", ranked second on Turkey's music charts and topped many radio playlists.

In 2013, Yener released two songs written and composed by Berksan: "Ya Ya Ya Ya" and "Biri Var". In April 2014, "Alt Dudak" was published as a promotional single from her eleventh studio album Mükemmel, which was released in June 2014. The second single from this album was "Naber", for which the footage of Yener's concert at the Harbiye Cemil Topuzlu Open-Air Theatre were used to make a music video for the song. In September 2014, Yener was featured on Berksan's single "Haberi Var mı?".

In 2015, Yener was among the artists whose names were included in Volga Tamöz's second studio album, No. 2, which was released in March. The two made the album's lead single "Sebastian". In July, her new single "Kışkışşş" was released. In August, a music video for the song "Hani Bana" was released, for which she again used the footage of her concert at the Harbiye Cemil Topuzlu Open-Air Theatre. In December, she released her first duet with Serdar Ortaç, titled "İki Deli".

Albums

Studio albums

Compilation albums

EPs

Split albums

Singles

As lead artist

As featured artist

Charts

Music videos

References

External links
 

Discographies of Turkish artists
Pop music discographies